Dongosaru is a village in Palau, and the capital of the state of Sonsorol. The population of the village as of 2014 was about 42.

Populated places in Palau
Sonsorol